Gymnopilus macrocheilocystidiatus is a species of mushroom in the family Hymenogastraceae.

See also

List of Gymnopilus species

External links
Gymnopilus macrocheilocystidiatus at Index Fungorum

macrocheilocystidiatus
Fungi of North America